The Holland River is a river in Ontario, Canada, that drains the Holland River watershed into Cook's Bay, the southern extremity of Lake Simcoe. The river flows generally north, and its headwaters lie in the Oak Ridges Moraine. The river's watershed also contains the Holland Marsh, a fertile farmland region renowned for its vegetable production.

The river was originally known as Micicaquean Creek, its indigenous name. It was renamed by Lieutenant-Governor Simcoe after Captain Samuel (Johannes) Holland, (1729–1801), Dutch-born first Surveyor General of British North America.

The Lake Simcoe Region Conservation Authority is responsible for leading the protection and environmental health of the Holland River, as it is within the Lake Simcoe watershed area.

See also
List of rivers of Ontario

References

External links
 Map of East Holland River Watershed area 
 Map of West Holland River Watershed area

Rivers of Simcoe County
Rivers of the Regional Municipality of York
Tributaries of Lake Simcoe